Reform, also referred to as Reform Magazine, is an editorially-independent subscription magazine published ten times a year by the United Reformed Church (URC). The editorial team is based at URC House in London.

Reform was first published in the year the URC was formed, 1972. The magazine explores theology, ethics, personal spirituality and Christian perspectives on social and current affairs. Articles are written by journalists, academics, politicians, campaigners, scientists and religious leaders. As well as interviews, features and book, music and film reviews, Reform carries regular lighthearted and anecdotal columns, a crossword, poetry and letters. It is currently edited by Stephen Tomkins.

Reform's interviewees have included: former Green Party Leader Jonathan Bartley, poets Benjamin Zephaniah and Stewart Henderson, Bafta-award-winning broadcaster Robert Beckford, novelist Marilynne Robinson, cofounder of Hillsong Church Bobbie Houston, historian Diarmaid MacCulloch, and theologian Paula Gooder. Though published by the URC, it has readers of all faiths and none.

References

External links
 Reform magazine: official website

1972 establishments in the United Kingdom
Religious magazines published in the United Kingdom
Christian magazines
Magazines about spirituality
Magazines established in 1972
United Reformed Church
Magazines published in London
Ten times annually magazines